Nurmela is a Finnish surname. Notable people with the surname include:

 Holger Nurmela (1920–2005), Swedish ice hockey player
 Kari Nurmela (1930–1984), Finnish opera singer
 Mika Nurmela (born 1971). Finnish footballer
 Tapio Nurmela (born 1975), Finnish Nordic combined skier
 Tauno Kalervo Nurmela (1907–1985), Finnish academic
 1696 Nurmela, asteroid, named after Tauno Kalervo Nurmela
 Sulo Nurmela (1908–1999), Finnish cross-country skier

Finnish-language surnames